Dream worlds (also called dream realms or illusory realms) are a commonly used plot device in fictional works, most notably in science fiction and fantasy fiction. The use of a dream world creates a situation whereby a character (or group of characters) is placed in a marvellous and unpredictable environment and must overcome several personal problems to leave it. The dream world also commonly serves to teach some moral or religious lessons to the character experiencing it – a lesson that the other characters will be unaware of, but one that will influence decisions made regarding them. When the character is reintroduced into the real world (usually when they wake up), the question arises as to what exactly constitutes reality due to the vivid recollection and experiences of the dream world.

According to J. R. R. Tolkien, dream worlds contrast with fantasy worlds, in which the world has existence independent of the characters in it. However, other authors have used the dreaming process as a way of accessing a world which, within the context of the fiction, holds as much consistency and continuity as physical reality. The use of "dream frames" to contain a fantasy world, and so explain away its marvels, has been criticized and has become much less prevalent.

Fictional dream worlds

Literature
A similar motif, Locus amoenus, is popular in medieval literature (esp. allegory and romance). A dream world is sometimes invoked in dream visions such as The Book of the Duchess and Piers Plowman.

One of the best-known dream worlds is Wonderland from Lewis Carroll's Alice's Adventures in Wonderland, as well as Looking-Glass Land from its sequel, Through the Looking-Glass. Unlike many dream worlds, Carroll's logic is like that of actual dreams, with transitions and causality flexible. James Branch Cabell's Smirt and its two sequels taken together form an extended dream and most of their action takes place in a dream world.

The action of The Bridge by Iain M. Banks takes place in a dream world. Other fictional dream worlds include the Dreamlands of H. P. Lovecraft's Dream Cycle and The Neverending Storys world of Fantasia, which includes places like the Desert of Lost Dreams, the Sea of Possibilities and the Swamps of Sadness. Dreamworlds, shared hallucinations and other alternate realities feature in a number of works by Philip K. Dick, such as The Three Stigmata of Palmer Eldritch and Ubik. Similar themes were explored by Jorge Luis Borges, for instance in The Circular Ruins.

In The Wheel of Time book series, "Tel'aran'rhiod" is a dream world that exists in close proximity to the real world. Objects and physical locations that do not frequently change in the real world have parallels in Tel'aran'rhiod. Ordinary people can occasionally slip into Tel'aran'rhiod during their sleep, and events that occur within this dream world have physical consequences. A person that dies in Tel'aran'rhiod will never wake up again, and in several cases it is shown that physical injuries gained there persist to the waking world. Tel'aran'rhiod can be controlled similar to a lucid dream, and several characters in the series can enter and manipulate Tel'aran'rhiod at will while asleep. Detaching oneself even from Tel'aran'rhiod can allow a person to peer directly into the dreams of others or even enter them, but that carries its own risks, especially if the inquirer has a particularly strong emotional bond with the dreaming person. It is also possible, yet highly taboo, for a person to physically enter Tel'aran'rhiod with their actual body, rather than just metaphysically while asleep, though this risks disturbing the very fabric of the dream world. Nevertheless, this can be used to, for example, cover great distances in a short time.

Paprika (1993) by Yasutaka Tsutsui is a science fiction novel that involves entering dream worlds using technology. In the book, dream monitoring and intervention as a means of treating mental disorders is a developing new form of psychotherapy in the near future. Unrest ensues when a new psychotherapy dream-analysis device is stolen, allowing the assailant to enter and manipulate people's dreams.

In the feminist science fiction novel The Kin of Ata Are Waiting for You, the Kin of Ata maintain the real world through their dreaming, making the real world a form of dream.

Film
In the 1939 movie, Oz from The Wonderful Wizard of Oz was altered from a fantasy world (in the novel) to a dream world of Dorothy's; characters who were independent inhabitants of Oz were transformed into dream parallels of introduced Kansas characters.

In The Matrix, Neo and the rest of the humans live inside a dream world. Their brains are hooked up to a computer network that creates this dream world. However, some may argue that this is not a dream world, as it seems completely normal and indistinguishable from reality (aside from time differences). In the 1980s, the Nightmare on Elm Street series of horror films introduced a dark dream realm inhabited by the supernatural serial killer Freddy Krueger.

In the movie Sharkboy and Lavagirl the main characters enter a world dreamt up by a small boy in order to save the real world.
Down Town is the land of nightmares where all people who are in comas go in the movie Monkeybone.

Dreamworlds also appear in Total Recall and Vanilla Sky.

Paprika (2006) is an anime film adaptation of the 1993 novel of the same name, which involves entering and manipulating dream worlds using dream-analysis devices.

The film Waking Life takes place almost entirely in a dream realm.

In the 2010 film Inception, main characters create artificial, vivid dream worlds and bring others into the dream worlds and perform various things with their brains, without them knowing. This may involve 'Extraction' (stealing memories and secrets), 'Inception' (planting an idea into the mind) and others.

Comic books, graphic novels and animation

One of the earliest newspaper comic strips, recounting Little Nemo's adventures in Slumberland, had a dream world theme.

Writer Neil Gaiman was tasked with re-imagining a Golden Age character, "The Sandman". In his version, the Sandman becomes Dream, the Lord of Dreams (also known, to various characters throughout the series, as Morpheus, Oneiros, the Shaper, the Shaper of Form, Lord of the Dreaming, the Dream King, Dream-Sneak, Dream Cat, Murphy, Kai'ckul, and Lord L'Zoril), who is essentially the anthropomorphic personification of dreams. At the start of the series, Morpheus is captured by an occult ritual and held prisoner for 70 years. Morpheus escapes in the modern day and, after avenging himself upon his captors, sets about rebuilding his kingdom, which has fallen into disrepair in his absence.

Dream worlds also appear in Rozen Maiden, in the Outback(s) of The Maxx; in Dream Land, the main setting of many Kirby games, in the webcomic The Dreamland Chronicles, and the movie Sailor Moon Super S the Movie: Black Dream Hole also have dream realms in their universes.

The American Dragon Jake Long episode "Dreamscape" takes place mainly in a dream realm. Similarly, the Xiaolin Showdown episode of the same title also uses the dream world in its plotline.

In Clamp manga series such as X/1999, Tsubasa: Reservoir Chronicle and xxxHolic, the dream world is very important to the events that occur within each story. It is later revealed in xxxHolic that the dream world itself is its own world, as part of the Clamp multiverse. Similarly, in the Bone graphic novel series by Jeff Smith, the primary plot device is a dream world called "The Dreaming." It exists independently from the real world, and it is described similarly to a river, being said to "flow" through people in "currents."

In JoJo's Bizarre Adventure part 3 "Stardust Crusaders," Jotaro and his friends and grandpa are put in a dream world that takes the form of an amusement park by Mannish Boy and his Death 13 stand.

In 1990, CITV created an animated Children's television series called The Dreamstone with their Settings inspired by that Dream Realms.

In the Jay Jay the Jet Plane cartoon series, adventures where air-breathing jet planes cannot go (underwater and in space) happen as dreams.

In Gravity Falls episode "Dreamscaperers" also takes place in a dream realm in which characters put into a person's mindscape. In this episode, Gideon summons a dream demon, Bill Cipher to invade Stan's mind and steal the combination to the safe, which is vincindoria. Dipper Pines with his sister Mabel and friend Soos also go into Stan's mind to stop Bill from finding out the combination.

In Archer is also reimagined in three self-contained universes from seasons eight to ten, when the main character, Sterling Archer, who falls into a coma after being shot, experiences a vivid dream-like explorations within Sterling's mind.

TV
The Star Trek: Voyager episode "Waking Moments" uses several dream realms and false awakenings.

In the UFO episode "Ordeal," Foster's abduction and rescue is explained away as a dream.

The whole of season 8 of Dallas was retroactively explained, at the start of Season 9, as a dream had by Bobby Ewing.

In the Xena: Warrior Princess episode, "Dreamworker", Morpheus, god of dreams, abducts Gabrielle to take as his bride. But Xena follows them into his realm, the DreamScape, where she battles to stop the impending forced marriage.

The Doctor Who episode, "Amy's Choice" also depicts multiple dream worlds, which were found out to have been induced by a parasitic seed. Dreamworlds are revisited in the Doctor Who Christmas special, "Last Christmas," which depicts dreams within dreams caused by mind-leeching aliens.

Video games
The video games The Legend of Zelda: Link's Awakening and Super Mario Bros. 2 take place in a dream of the Wind Fish's (whom Link must wake up) and Mario's respectively.

Alundra revolves around a dreamwalker who can enter people's dreams. It takes place on an island, where a village has locals suffering from recurring nightmares that sometimes cause death. With his dreamwalking ability, the titular protagonist Alundra attempts to help the locals by entering their dreams.

In the first two games of the EarthBound series, the protagonist (Ninten in EarthBound Zero and Ness in EarthBound) must travel to a dream world named Magicant. However, the two Magicants are different from each other. Ninten visits his Magicant, which is light pink and has seashell spires and clouds, multiple times during the story, until it is revealed to not be his own Magicant but instead just a collection of the memories of his great-grandmother, Maria. Ness's Magicant is a surreal, spacelike land in a purple sea that Ness only gains access to once he records the eight melodies into his Sound Stone, which he then must travel to the center of in order to overcome his weaknesses, characterized by a boss battle against his 'Nightmare' (with an appearance similar to the 'Mani-Mani Statue', a mysterious object encountered in another dreamworld called Moonside), and absorb the power of the Earth into his heart.

About a half of Tak 2: The Staff of Dreams takes place in the Dream World, home to the Staff of Dreams, which was later split by Pins and Needles, where Tak has a half of the staff and Pins and Needles have the Staff of Nightmares half. By the end of the game, Tak restored the staff.

In Dragon Quest VI: Realms of Reverie, the game is split between two worlds initially known as the Real World and the Phantom World, named such because any being from the Real World is rendered unseen by the inhabitants of the Phantom World, like a phantom, and are only capable of becoming visible after drinking a special elixir. After a time, it is revealed that the Phantom World is in fact the true Real World, while the former Real World is called the Dream World, created from the dreams of the people of the Real World, in which each inhabitant has a Dream World counterpart. In addition, the main antagonist of the game, Deathtamoor, plots to try to merge both the Real World and Dream World with his own "Dark World" in an attempt for world domination.

In Dreamfall: The Longest Journey and Dreamfall Chapters the protagonist Zoë Castillo can travel to Marcuria by dreaming. There's a third world called 'Storytime' inspired by the Australian Dreamtime myths which is the place of the creation and where every story begins and ends. Also, the protagonist must stop a corporation called WATI-Corp which want to steal dreams and memories from people through their new entertainment device: the Dreamachine which allows people to make lucid dreams.

In Final Fantasy VIII, the main group of protagonists sometimes experience the lives of three soldiers, Laguna, Kiros, and Ward in what they call "the dream world" (which is actually the past) through a mysterious and gifted woman who is acquainted with both parties. The whole of Zanarkand in Final Fantasy X and its HD remake was a dream, along with the main character, Tidus.

In the video game The Elder Scrolls IV: Oblivion, there is a short quest which takes place in a dream world. In the video game, Fallout 3, a main storyline quest involves the main character going into a virtual reality simulator, referred to as "Tranquility Lane," a dream world simulation of a 1950s suburban neighborhood.   

In the video game Driver: San Francisco, main character John Tanner suffers a car accident that leaves him in a coma. The game take places in his dream, but the character himself doesn't realize he's dreaming. Instead, he thinks he had a lucky escape and with this, thinks that he got an ability to possess other people. During the game, many billboards will turn black and show "wake up" messages.

In Mario & Luigi: Dream Team for the Nintendo 3DS, there are stone pillows that Luigi can use to summon a portal to his dreams, allowing Mario to jump in and rescue the Pi'illo creature trapped within the pillow. Mario is accompanied by a Dreamy version of Luigi named Dreamy Luigi, who possesses vast powers, notably cloning, as seen in the game's unlockable "Luiginary Attacks".

In Pokémon Black and White and its following sequel, players can tuck in one of their Pokémon via a system known as Game Sync. As the tucked in Pokémon falls asleep, it will then be sent to special website, where the player can play with his/her Pokémon in an alternate world called the "Dream World".

In Kingdom Hearts 3D: Dream Drop Distance, the seventh installment in the game series Kingdom Hearts, the two main protagonists are sent to worlds that are in slumber and that are dreaming in order to pass the Mark of mastery exam.

The Klonoa series revolves around the titular Klonoa, who is a Dream Traveler who is called upon to restore balance to dreamworlds that are in peril, such as Phantomile in Klonoa: Door to Phantomile and Lunatea in Klonoa 2: Lunatea's Veil. Similarly, the Nights series, whose title character is a protector of dreams, prominently features the dreamworlds Nightopia and Nightmare, which collectively make up the Night Dimension.

Bloodborne takes place in, or partially in, a dream realm, with areas such as the Nightmare of Mensis and the Hunter's Dream. The entire city the game takes place in is implied to be a collective, self-sustaining dream that all its inhabitants, human, mutant, and Cosmic Entity, contribute to.

The game Tales of Maj'Eyal features a class called the Solipist, who believes the world is their own dream (although this is closer to the Dream argument than solipsism), granting them psychic powers based on Lucid Dreaming.

Other dreamworlds are the Maginaryworld from Sonic Shuffle, Dream Depot from Mario Party 5, and Headspace from Omori.

See also
 Astral plane
 Astral projection
 Isekai
 Lucid dream
 Simulated reality
 Simulated reality in fiction
 The Dreaming
 Vision (spirituality)

References

World
 World
Fantasy worlds
Fiction
Narrative techniques
Science fiction themes
Setting
Fantasy tropes
Literary motifs